Olina is a village in the region of Emilia-Romagna in northern Italy. Administratively, it is a frazione of the comune of Pavullo nel Frignano in the province of Modena.

References

Frazioni of the Province of Modena